Thomas Raymond Shadden (January 17, 1920 - April 22, 2000) was a US politician, who served as a member of the Tennessee State House of Representatives, the Tennessee State Senate, and as Mayor of the City of Crossville.

Early life 
Shadden was born in Morgan County, Tennessee.

Military service 
Shadden served in the U.S. Army during World War II.

References 

1920 births
2000 deaths
Members of the Tennessee House of Representatives
People from Morgan County, Tennessee
Tennessee state senators
Mayors of places in Tennessee
People from Crossville, Tennessee

20th-century American politicians
United States Army personnel of World War II